The 2020 Wolffkran Open was a professional tennis tournament played on carpet courts. It was the fourth edition of the tournament which was part of the 2020 ATP Challenger Tour. It took place in Ismaning, Germany between 19 and 25 October 2020.

Singles main draw entrants

Seeds

 1 Rankings are as of 12 October 2020.

Other entrants
The following players received wildcards into the singles main draw:
  Maximilian Marterer
  Max Hans Rehberg
  Mats Rosenkranz

The following player received entry into the singles main draw using a protected ranking:
  Dustin Brown

The following players received entry from the qualifying draw:
  Tomás Martín Etcheverry
  Julian Lenz
  Daniel Masur
  Lucas Miedler

Champions

Singles

  Marc-Andrea Hüsler def.  Botic van de Zandschulp 6–7(3–7), 7–6(7–2), 7–5.

Doubles

  Andre Begemann /  David Pel def.  Lloyd Glasspool /  Alex Lawson 5–7, 7–6(7–2), [10–4].

References

External links
 Official website

Wolffkran Open
2020
Wolf
October 2020 sports events in Germany